Akhtar Ali (Urdu: اختر علی) (5 July 1939 – 7 February 2021), was an Indian tennis player. He was a member of the Indian Davis Cup team continuously from 1958 to 1964 and captain of Indian Davis Cup in 2008.

Later he turned to coaching and coached the players like Ramesh Krishnan, Vijay Amritraj, Anand Amritraj and Leander Paes. He was father of Zeeshan Ali, a former Indian national tennis champion, Nilofer Ali and Zareen Desai.

Post career
Akhtar Ali started a junior development programme at the South Club. The trainees were divided into three categories — under-14, under-16 and under-18. Free coaching was provided to the state’s best players.

Akhtar Ali died on 7 February 2021, aged 81.

Awards
Winner of the Arjuna Awardees in Lawn Tennis in 2000.

Allsport Management, a city-based sports management company along with Ontrack Systems Ltd., an ISO 9001:2000 global IT & ITES company,  presented GOLDEN AKHTAR, a programme to felicitate Akhtar Ali on his 50th year of yeoman service to Indian Tennis on Wednesday, September 21, 2005 at ITC Sonar Bangla Sheraton Hotel & Tower in Kolkata.

References

External links
 
 Bengal Tennis - The Bengal Tennis Association is the governing body of West Bengal's Lawn Tennis activities. West Bengal has always been a super power among India's tennis playing states. Winner of several National Tennis Championships, Bengal has produced many wonderful players like Akhtar Ali, Joydeep Mukherjee, Zeeshan Ali, Leander Paes etc.

2021 deaths
Indian male tennis players
1939 births
Recipients of the Arjuna Award